McCredie may refer to:

People
 Colin McCredie (born 1972), Scottish actor
 George McCredie (1859–1903), Australian politician
 Malcolm McCredie (born 1942), Australian cyclist
 Nancy McCredie (1945–2021), Canadian athlete
 Nellie McCredie (1901–1968), Australian architect and potter
 Walt McCredie (1876–1934), American baseball player
 William Wallace McCredie (1862–1935), American politician

Places
 McCredie Springs, Lane County, Oregon, U.S.
 McCredie Township, Callaway County, Missouri, U.S.

See also

 MacCready, a surname
 McCreadie, a surname
 McCready, a surname
 R v McCredie, UK insolvency law case